The  Philadelphia Eagles season was the franchise's 81st season in the National Football League, and the first under head coach Chip Kelly. The Eagles improved on their 4–12 record from 2012, finishing 10–6 and clinching the NFC East division title and the playoffs for the first time since 2010, but after a close game, they lost on a last-second field goal to the New Orleans Saints in the Wild Card round of the playoffs, by a score of 26–24. The season was noted for LeSean McCoy winning the NFL rushing title, and the extremely successful season by Nick Foles where he produced 27 touchdowns to only 2 interceptions. Foles also threw seven touchdowns against the Oakland Raiders, tying an NFL record for most touchdowns in a single game.

This was the Eagles' first season since 1998 without long-time head coach Andy Reid, who was fired following the 2012 season, and would become the head coach of the Kansas City Chiefs after his dismissal. Reid made his first return to Philadelphia during Week 3, in which the Chiefs won 16–26.

The Eagles had a three-way quarterback competition with Nick Foles, Michael Vick and Matt Barkley, with Vick winning the job. After Vick got injured, however, Foles took over as quarterback and was eventually named the new starting quarterback despite Vick's return.

It took 62 weeks overall for the Eagles to win a home game; they continued the home losing streak that lasted throughout the rest of the 2012 season and extended it to 10 games, but they ended the streak by winning 24–16 against Washington at the Linc in Week 11.

Personnel changes
On December 31, 2012, long time head coach Andy Reid was fired. On January 16, 2013, Chip Kelly was hired as the new head coach.

On January 20, Pat Shurmur accepted the offensive coordinator job. Billy Davis accepted the defensive coordinator position on February 7.

Tom Gamble was named Vice-president of Player Personnel on February 13, a position that had been vacant since Ryan Grigson left to become general manager of the Indianapolis Colts.

Roster changes

Free agents

Signings

Trades

On March 15, the Eagles traded their sixth round pick and a conditional 2014 pick to the Tampa Bay Buccaneers for wide receiver Arrelious Benn and the Bucs' 2013 seventh round pick.
On March 28, the Eagles traded fullback Stanley Havili to the Indianapolis Colts in exchange for defensive end Clifton Geathers.
On April 11, the Eagles traded running back Dion Lewis to the Cleveland Browns for linebacker Emmanuel Acho.
On August 12, the Eagles traded offensive guard Nate Menkin to the Houston Texans for wide receiver Jeff Maehl.

2013 draft class

Notes
 The Eagles traded their original fourth- and seventh-round selections (101st and 210th overall) to the Jacksonville Jaguars in exchange for the Jaguars' fourth-round selection (98th overall).
 The Eagles traded their original sixth-round selection (173rd overall) to the Cleveland Browns in exchange for safety David Sims and the Browns' seventh-round selection (212th overall).
 The Eagles acquired an additional sixth-round selection (196th overall) in a  trade that sent defensive tackle Brodrick Bunkley to the Denver Broncos; the Eagles later traded this selection along with a conditional 2014 selection to the Tampa Bay Buccaneers in exchange for wide receiver Arrelious Benn and the Buccaneers' 2013 seventh-round selection (218th overall).
 Compensatory selection.

Staff

Final roster

Preseason

Regular season

Schedule

Note: Intra-division opponents are in bold text.

Game summaries

Week 1: at Washington Redskins

The Eagles started their 2013 season on the road against the Redskins. The Skins scored first when DeAngelo Hall returned a fumble 75 yards for a touchdown for a 7–0 lead. After this the Eagles dominated scoring 33 straight points as Alex Henery kicked a field goal from 48 yards out to come within four points for a 7–3 game. Next Michael Vick found DeSean Jackson on a 25-yard pass as the team took the lead 10–7. On the Skins' next possession, Alfred Morris was tackled in the end zone for a safety making the score 12–7. In the second quarter, the Eagles continued to increase their lead as Vick found Brent Celek on a 28-yard touchdown pass for a 19–7 lead. Later on in the quarter, Vick ran for a 3-yard touchdown bringing the halftime score to 26–7. In the third quarter, LeSean McCoy ran for a 34-yard touchdown bringing the score to 33–7. The Skins started their scoring again as Morris ran for a 5-yard touchdown making the score 33–14. In the fourth quarter, it was all Skins as RG3 found Leonard Hankerson on a 10-yard touchdown pass (with a failed two-point conversion) for a 33–20 game. Finally, the Skins came within six points as RG3 and Hankerson connected again this time on a 24-yard pass bringing the final score to 33–27.

With the win, the Eagles started their season 1–0.

Week 2: vs. San Diego Chargers

The Eagles punted on their first possession. The Chargers took the ball and marched to the Eagles 31, but had to settle for a 49 field goal. The Eagles took the ball next and stormed 75 yards in 5 plays, driving to the Chargers 2, but kicked a field goal.

Week 3: vs. Kansas City Chiefs

This week marked the return of former Eagles head coach Andy Reid. The Eagles forced the Chiefs to a quick three-and-out, but the Eagles muffed the punt, and the Chiefs recovered at the Philadelphia 8. A few plays later, Ryan Succop kicked a 33-yard field goal. On Philadelphia's first possession, Michael Vick was intercepted by Eric Berry, on a pass intended for Brent Celek, who returned it 38 yards for a touchdown. After a Chiefs punt, Michael Vick busted off a 61-yard run, setting up his 22-yard touchdown pass to Jason Avant. Zach Ertz attempted to run in the two-point conversion, but failed, keeping the score 10–6. With less than a minute remaining in the first quarter the Eagles drove into Chiefs territory, but Vick was sacked by Justin Houston and fumbled. Two field goals by Ryan Succop was the only scoring of the second quarter, giving the Chiefs a 16–6 halftime lead. An Alex Henery field goal was the only score of the third quarter, giving the Chiefs a 16–9 lead entering the fourth quarter. On their first drive of the fourth quarter, Jamaal Charles capped off an eight-play, 62-yard drive with a 3-yard touchdown run, making the score 23–9. The Eagles immediately responded with a touchdown of their own, driving 78 yards with a 41-yard touchdown rush by LeSean McCoy, pulling to within 7. However, Kansas City struck the decisive blow with a 15-play, 73-yard drive, taking 8:15 off the clock and Ryan Succop adding his fourth field goals making the score 26–16. On their next drive, Michael Vick completed a 19-yard pass on third-and-10, but guard Todd Herremans was called for holding making it third-and-20 at their own 21. The Eagles turned the ball over on downs. The Chiefs did the same on their next drive. Finally, a strip sack by Justin Houston with recovering for Kansas City, sealed the deal. With the loss, the Eagles lost their second in a row, both being at home. The Eagles outgained Chiefs 431–394 and had more first downs, 21–19, but the Chiefs had almost twice as much time of possession and won the turnover battle 5–0.

Week 4: at Denver Broncos

The Eagles visited Sports Authority Field in Denver to face the Broncos and their #1 offense. The Eagles received the ball first, but punted after only four plays. The Broncos took over and stormed 74 yards in only 9 plays to take the early lead. On the drive the Broncos converted three third downs on the drive including one on Peyton Manning's 6-yard touchdown pass to Wes Welker. The Eagles responded on their next drive by driving from their own 18 to the Broncos 17, but had to settle for Henery's 35-yard field goal. On the ensuing kickoff Trindon Holliday returned the kick 105 yards for a touchdown, extending the lead to 14–3. The Eagles then engineered a 15-play, 73-yard drive to the 7-yard line, but the Broncos kept them out of the end zone and Henery kicked a 25-yard field goal. After a Broncos three-and-out, the Eagles finally managed to reach the end zone. They needed only 7 plays to go 64 yards. A 35-yard completion to Bryce Brown on third-and-11 moved the ball to the Denver 4. Two plays later Chris Polk rushed for a 4-yard touchdown, trimming the score to 14–13. Denver responded by marching 80 yards in 11 plays in a drive that took over 6 minutes off the clock and increased the lead to 21–13 after a Knowshon Moreno 4-yard touchdown run. Both teams punted to close out the half. Denver started where they left off, driving 80 yards in one less play culminating in Manning's 1-yard touchdown pass to Demaryius Thomas. Manning threw for 44 yards on the drive. After an Eagles punt, the Broncos ate 80 more yards on another touchdown drive which. Manning continued to pick apart the Eagles secondary throwing for 58 yards on the drive which concluded with Manning once again connecting with Demaryius Thomas on a touchdown, this one for 15 yards, extending the lead to 35–13. The Eagles offense continued sputter as they punted again. The Broncos were completely the opposite, driving 65 yards for another touchdown, increasing the lead to 42–13. Manning added 56 more yards and a 4-yard touchdown pass to Welker. The Broncos forced the Eagles to punt again, but Steven Johnson blocked it and returned it 17 yards for a touchdown, making the score 49–13. The Eagles finally managed to avoid punting on their next drive, but Henery missed a 46-yard field goal. Matt Prater made one from 53 yards away on the Broncos next drive to make the score 52–13. The Eagles managed to march 80 yards on their next drive with Nick Foles hitting Jeff Maehl for a 6-yard touchdown pass to close the scoring. The Broncos held the ball for the final 4:35 to end the game. The Eagles lost their third in a row to fall to 1–3 on the season.

Week 5: at New York Giants

Nick Foles relieved an injured Michael Vick. With the win, the Eagles improved to 2–3.

Week 6: at Tampa Bay Buccaneers

With the win, the Eagles improved to 3–3.

Week 7: vs. Dallas Cowboys

With the loss, the Eagles fell to 3–4.

Week 8: vs. New York Giants

Nick Foles was injured again, so Michael Vick was reinserted into the starting role, but after a few series, Matt Barkley took his place. Despite the Eagles defense not allowing a touchdown all game, the offense was stymied throughout the contest. Philadelphia's lone score, and the game's only touchdown, occurred on a fumble recovery late in the fourth quarter; the Giants botched a snap for a punt, which was then recovered by Najee Goode in New York's endzone for a touchdown. With the 15-7 loss, the Eagles fell to 3–5. As of the 2021 season, this is Philadelphia's most recent home loss to New York.

Week 9: at Oakland Raiders

Nick Foles tied an NFL record in this game with seven touchdown passes as the Eagles beat the Raiders 49–20.

Week 10: at Green Bay Packers

Nick Foles threw three touchdown passes in this game, and the Eagles defense intercepted Scott Tolzien twice. Tolzien started in place of Aaron Rodgers, who had a collarbone injury.

With the win, the Eagles evened their record at 5–5.

Week 11: vs. Washington Redskins

A late game rally by Washington led them to the Eagles' 26-yard line. A shot to the end zone by Robert Griffin III was intercepted by Brandon Boykin, clinching an Eagles win. The Eagles moved to 6–5. This is the Eagles first win at Lincoln Financial Field since Week 4 of the 2012 season, because prior to this game, the Eagles had never won a game in their home stadium in 414 days since that same week, snapping a 10-game losing streak at home with this win.

Week 13: vs. Arizona Cardinals

With the win, the Eagles improved to 7–5.

Week 14: vs. Detroit Lions

In a blinding snowstorm, with at least eight inches of snow on the field by the end of the game, LeSean McCoy broke the Eagles' single-game rushing record with 217 yards on the ground.

Week 15: at Minnesota Vikings

With the loss, the Eagles fell to 8–6.

Week 16: vs. Chicago Bears

The Eagles beat the Chicago Bears 54–11 on Sunday Night Football. Nick Foles went 21/25 for 230 yards and two touchdowns. LeSean McCoy ran the ball 18 times for 133 yards and two touchdowns. Towards the end, the Eagles brought in bench players to finish the game. Bryce Brown ran for a 65-yard touchdown with 6:14 to go with Michael Vick at the quarterback helm. This was Michael Vick's final appearance as an Eagle. This was the first game in NFL history to end with a final score of 54–11.

With the convincing win, the Eagles improved to 9–6, and would face their archrivals, the Dallas Cowboys, the following Sunday night for the division title.

Week 17: at Dallas Cowboys

This game ended when Kyle Orton threw an interception late in the fourth quarter. With the win, the Eagles improved to 10–6 and sealed the NFC East title and the #3 seed in the playoffs. They were also the third team in a row to defeat the Cowboys in the last game of the regular season on Sunday Night Football (Giants, 2011 and Redskins, 2012).

Standings

Division

Conference

Postseason

Schedule

Game summaries

NFC Wild Card Playoff Game: vs. (6) New Orleans Saints

The Eagles hosted the Saints in the Wild Card round. This was the first playoff game between the Saints and Eagles since the 2006 NFC Divisional Playoff game, which New Orleans won 26–24. The Saints had never won a road playoff game coming into this game. Philadelphia led 24–23 with less than a minute remaining. But the Saints marched down the field to win it with a Shayne Graham field goal as time expired.

With the heartbreaking loss, the Eagles ended the season with an overall record of 10–7. This was their final appearance in the playoffs until 2017, when they went on to win Super Bowl LII.

References

External links

Philadelphia
Philadelphia Eagles seasons
NFC East championship seasons
Philadelphia Eagles